Rogério Tavares (born 3 December 1912, date of death unknown) was a Portuguese sports shooter. He competed at the 1952 Summer Olympics and 1960 Summer Olympics.

References

1912 births
Year of death missing
Portuguese male sport shooters
Olympic shooters of Portugal
Shooters at the 1952 Summer Olympics
Shooters at the 1960 Summer Olympics
Sportspeople from Porto